James M. Redfield (born 1935) is the Edward Olson Distinguished Service Professor of Classics at the University of Chicago. He has made numerous contributions to current scholarship on Homer and Herodotus, probably the most notable of which is his book, Nature and Culture in the Iliad: The Tragedy of Hector (University of Chicago Press, 1975), an anthropological reading of the Iliad with the stated goal of analyzing Hector's role in the work.

Biography 
Redfield's father, Robert Redfield, was also a University of Chicago professor, teaching anthropology and ethnolinguistics, and serving as Dean of the Division of the Social Sciences from 1934 to 1946.

James Redfield is a member of the Department of Classical Languages and Literature and the Committee on Social Thought at Chicago. He took his undergraduate degree from the University of Chicago in 1954, studied at New College, Oxford from 1956 to 1958, and returned to Chicago for his Ph.D. in 1961. He was appointed as a professor at The College at the University of Chicago in 1976. He retired in 2016.

Redfield holds the distinction of having been awarded the University's Quantrell Award for Excellence in Undergraduate Teaching twice, once in 1965 and again in 1987.

Publications 
Nature and Culture in the Iliad: The Tragedy of Hector (University of Chicago Press, 1975)
The Locrian Maidens: Love and Death in Greek Italy (University of Chicago Press, 2004)

External links
Redfield's University of Chicago faculty page

Living people
American classical scholars
Classical scholars of the University of Chicago
University of Chicago Laboratory Schools alumni
Scholars of ancient Greek literature
1935 births